Tseng Tai-lin (born in Taipei) is a Taiwanese football (soccer) and futsal player.

Nicknamed Little Tiger, Tseng started to play football at Li Nong Elementary School in Taipei. His usual position is an attacking midfielder. He was once praised as "the best footballer in Taiwan" by then Yugoslavian coach of NSTC football team in 2003. He was also voted the best attacking midfielder during the Chinese Taipei National Football League 2005 season when he played for Ming Chuan University.

In addition to association football, Tseng is active in futsal as well. He has represented Chinese Taipei in many international futsal competitions.

However, a lasting ankle injury has influenced his performance in recent years. As a result, he was dropped from the Chinese Taipei squad during 2007 AFC Asian Cup qualifications in 2006.

From 2005 to 2007, he served in military service and plays for Taiwan National Sports Training Center football team. After retiring from military service, he joined Tatung F.C. in shirt number 79.

Besides playing for Ming Chuan, he also serves as the team's assistant coach.

References

Living people
Taiwanese footballers
Taiwanese men's futsal players
Tatung F.C. players
Footballers from Taipei
Association football midfielders
Year of birth missing (living people)